Seo Hyuk-Su (born October 1, 1973 in Jecheon, South Korea) is a Korean-Australian former footballer.

Biography

Club career
Hyuk-Su Seo played every second of the inaugural A-League season and has currently played the equal second-greatest number of games for the Queensland Roar along with Massimo Murdocca, as of January 2009, behind Matt McKay. He became an Australian citizen in 2007. The 35-year-old Queensland Roar foundation player was released from his contract, after 4 years with the Roar. Seo was a highly valued member of the team and a fan favourite during his time with the club.

Club career statistics

Honours
Personal honours:
 Queensland Roar Gary Wilkins Medal: 2005–2006
 Queensland Roar Player's Player of the Year: 2005–2006

References

External links
 
 A-League Player Record

1973 births
Living people
Association football fullbacks
South Korean footballers
South Korean expatriate footballers
Jeonbuk Hyundai Motors players
Seongnam FC players
Brisbane Roar FC players
K League 1 players
A-League Men players
Expatriate soccer players in Australia
South Korean expatriate sportspeople in Australia
People from Jecheon
Sportspeople from North Chungcheong Province